Puertollano is a municipality of Spain located in the province of Ciudad Real, Castile-La Mancha. The city has a population of 47,035 (2019). Contrasting to the largely rural character of the region, Puertollano stands out for the importance of industry, with a past linked to industrial and mining activities. It lies on the AVE high speed train line linking Madrid and Seville (opened 1992).

Geography

Location 

Puertollano is located in the Iberian Peninsula, in the transitional region between the southern half of the Inner Plateau and the northern reaches of Sierra Morena.

It lies at the natural pass linking the plains of Argamasilla to the North and the valley of the  river to the south, on which a modest East–West chain of mountains interrupts, at about 710 metres above sea level.

It is sided by the Cerro de Santa Ana (900 m) and the Cerro de San Sebastián (880 m), hills located, respectively, to the North-East and West of the urban nucleus.

It is located in the southern limits of the Campo de Calatrava volcanic region, featuring the famous Fuente Agria, an instance of the many ferruginous water springs with high CO2 content common in the volcanic area.

History 
Archaeological investigations have shown that the area was inhabited in prehistoric times (Homo heidelbergensis and Homo antecessor). Bronze Age weapons have been found and also a Visigoth necropolis from the post-Roman period.

Later the region formed part of the depopulated nomansland between Christian (Northern) Spain and the Moorish Caliphate to the south.

With the Spanish victory at the Battle of Las Navas de Tolosa (1212) the region was reconquered. The authorities encouraged people from northern Spain to settle in the newly conquered empty lands. Puertollano (then Puertoplano) was founded as a hamlet shortly after. In 1348 however, the Black Death devastated the village, killing all but 13 inhabitants.

Philip II granted Puertollano the title of town (villa) in 1576 as well as the arms of the House of Austria.

It continued to grow slowly as a small town specializing in textiles and ceramics.

As coal was discovered in 1873, the village became a mining town from then on, leading to a sudden growth in the population. The apex of the economic importance of coal mining took place during World War I as the imports of British coal were not available, and the local economy based on the extraction of bituminous coal thrived in the national market. In 1920 the population had reached 20,083.

Puertollano was granted the title of city (ciudad) via Royal Decree in June 1925, during the dictatorship of Primo de Rivera. Following the end of the Spanish Civil War and up until the 1973 oil crisis the economic activity of Puertollano readjusted towards the extraction of oil shale.

Economy 

Puertollano is the largest industrial center in the Castilla-La Mancha region. It was formerly a coal mining town but today only one open-cast mine remains.

Nowadays the main industries are petrochemicals (Repsol), fertilisers (Fertiberia), power generation and, most recently, the manufacture of solar panels. The city has received national and EU aid to diversify its economy after the decline of the coal industry.

Points of interest
The Dehesa Boyal de Puertollano botanical gardens is located in the city.

Notable people
 Santiago Cañizares, former footballer.
 María Dueñas, author.
 Cristina García Rodero, photographer.

References 
Citations

Bibliography

External links 
 
  

 
Municipalities in the Province of Ciudad Real